Kieran Low (born 27 January 1991) is a retired Scottish international rugby union footballer who played either as a lock or loose forward. He spent most of his career at London Irish and had short spells at London Welsh, Glasgow Warriors and Saracens.

Club career
Low was born in Chichester  and started out playing for Chichester Rugby Club in his hometown before being spotted by London Irish.  He was initially a member of the London Irish academy and had a short spell on loan at London Welsh before establishing himself firmly in the Exiles first team. He made more than 60 appearances for Irish.

Low moved to Scotland to join Glasgow Warriors for the 2015–16 season, but he did not settle and his playing time was limited by the mental and physical effects of repeated concussions.

Low joined Aviva Premiership champions Saracens 30 December 2015 on loan for the remainder of the 2015-16 season. He retired at the end of the season, aged 25, and has since worked as a painter and decorator.

International career

References

External links
London Irish Profile 
ESPN Scrum Profile

1991 births
Living people
Rugby union locks
London Irish players
London Welsh RFC players
Glasgow Warriors players
Saracens F.C. players
Scottish rugby union players
Scotland international rugby union players
English people of Scottish descent
Rugby union players from Chichester